The Federal Military Memorial Cemetery (Russian: Федеральное военное мемориальное кладбище) is a national cemetery of Russia, located in Mytishchinsky District, Moscow Oblast, on the north-eastern outskirts of Moscow.

The cemetery was built as the new burial place for national dignitaries to replace the Kremlin Wall Necropolis, where burials ceased after 1985, and was opened with its inaugural burial on 21 June 2013.

History
The first decision to establish a national cemetery was adopted in 1953, as a resolution of the USSR Council of Ministers, but the project was never implemented. The burial of national dignitaries irregularly took place at the Kremlin Wall Necropolis in Red Square, Moscow, ending with the funeral of Soviet General Secretary Konstantin Chernenko in March 1985. After the fall of the Soviet Union in 1991, there were plans to relocate the Kremlin Wall Necropolis, since it ruins the old style of the Moscow Kremlin. The concept of a national cemetery was resurrected in the early 1990s by a state-owned body called Mosproject-4, and the designer Alexander Taranin said he wanted to "create a minimalistic cemetery that gave a quiet and honest reflection of Russia". The cemetery was established in accordance with the Presidential Decree of July 11, 2001, number 829 "On the Federal Military Memorial Cemetery" to "perpetuate the memory of soldiers and other Russian citizens who died in the defense of the Motherland, and who had special merits to the state".

Construction of the Federal Military Memorial Cemetery began on March 15, 2008, on a 55 hectare plot off the Ostashkovskoe highway, located near the villages of Sgonniki and Borisovka in Mytishchinsky District, Moscow Oblast, west of the city of Mytishchi. The cemetery is planned to be the main national cemetery of Russia for the next 200 years, and is predicted to house 40,000 graves. On June 21, 2013, the inaugural burial took place when the remains of an unknown Red Army soldier who died in Smolensk Oblast during World War II, and the complex was officially opened to the public the following day. On August 30, 2013, Patriarch Kirill of Moscow consecrated the cornerstone of the cemetery church in honor of St. Sergius of Radonezh, which was opened in 2014. On December 27, 2013, the funeral of Mikhail Kalashnikov became the inaugural funeral held at the cemetery, conducted by Metropolitan Juvenaly of Krutitsy and Kolomna.

Design

The award-winning artist and architect Sergey Vitalevich Goryaev served as artistic director of the project. According to the British newspaper The Daily Telegraph, the cemetery will be "a testament to extravagance, a piece of architectural monumentalism intended to reflect the glory of a resurgent Russia. Drawings show that the  site will feature obelisks, golden statues of figures from Russia's past and friezes of workers in heroic poses. The cemetery will be richly adorned, using red and grey granite together with bronze". Goryaev died on September 8, 2013, just months after the cemetery's completion.

In 2015, monuments were planned to be installed on the first five graves. It is assumed that all the gravestones on the cemetery will be maintained in a uniform style and correspond to the three categories of burials. The contractor should have been selected by the competition, the documentation for which was developed by the specialists of the cemetery. The first contest was to be held in September 2015, but was canceled. The Ministry of Defense appealed to the sculptors and pointed to the obvious shortcomings in the sketches of monuments described in the tender documentation. For example, it turned out that the bust of military commanders was cut off exactly on half of the epaulettes. Neither the developers of the documentation, nor their curators in the management of the perpetuation of memory, this fact apparently did not embarrass. Ended all the cancellation of the contest and a behind-the-scenes scandal, as a result of which several people from the cemetery administration were appointed guilty and fired.

Unique in the Russian monumental architecture and art ensemble is divided into four zones: entrance, production, ritual and burial area (including columbarium). For the construction granite and marble were used. At the main entrance to the necropolis are large steles. The black cubes at the crossing symbolize the views of the Armed Forces in the Great Patriotic War: the ground forces, the navy, the air force and the rear of the Armed Forces. The main central Alley is two kilometers long, along it are all architectural objects. The functional part consists of four pavilions, including the underground memorial hall, a ritual store, a cafeteria and a public toilet. The bridge, constructed above the beam, symbolically linking life to death, continues with the Alley of Heroes. On it, tracing the history of Russia from antiquity to the present day, 24 bronze figures of soldiers are installed in the stylized form of six historical epochs: from Dmitry Donskoy's warriors to modern special forces soldiers. On the other side of the bridge there is a ritual zone, two mourning houses, decorated in a single Shchusev style.

Funeral houses are rich in interior decoration in the form of mosaic panels. The first is decorated in a state-owned, powerful style, decorated with symbols in the form of Kremlin towers, a two-headed eagle. The second mourning house is decorated in a military style. At the end of the burial zone, the monument "Tribulation" is established: the mother with the dying warrior son. Before the sculpture is a bowl of water, symbolizing sadness, in the center of the water mirror the Eternal fire burns.
On both sides of the Mall are 15 special sites intended for burial of the Supreme Commander-in-Chief of the Armed Forces of the Russian Federation. Land plots for permanent graves have an area of 5 sq.m. – 2.5 x 2 meters. Only one person can be buried in one section and subsequently his spouse or spouse.

With each burial of a military person, military honors are stipulated, regulated by the Charter of garrison and guard services of the Armed Forces of the Russian Federation. When burial of civilians, regulations are in place for burial according to the state protocol, where an honor guard, an orchestra, a solemn march are also provided.

A uniform regulation of tombstones is in place: a bust or bas-relief. The base and its base are made of natural stone (granite of black, red or gray colors). In some cases, they are made of bronze. Established not earlier than one year after the burial, relatives can choose only the color of the stone. Uniform requirements are also applied to the design of the memorial plate for the columbarium niche – it is made of bronze or black granite. An inscription with an honorary (military) rank (if any), a surname, a name, a patronymic, a date of birth and death is put on the memorial plate.

Notable burials
 Yevgeny Barilovich (1932–2020), captain 1st rank, Hero of the Soviet Union
 Aleksandr Denisov (1955–2020), lieutenant-general
 Mikhail Kalashnikov (1919–2013), lieutenant-general, Hero of the Russian Federation, creator of the Kalashnikov rifle
 Nikolai Kuimov (1957–2021), lieutenant colonel, Hero of the Russian Federation
 Alexei Leonov (1934–2019), major-general, two times Hero of the Soviet Union, cosmonaut and first person to walk in space
 Nikolai Lukashevich (1941–2021), colonel-general
 Nikolai Moskvitelev (1926–2020), colonel-general
 Vasiliy Petrov (1917–2014), Marshal of the Soviet Union
 Igor Rodionov (1936–2014), Defence Minister of the Russian Federation
 Yevgeny Shaposhnikov (1942–2020), Marshal of Aviation and last Minister of Defence
 Vladimir Shatalov (1927–2021), lieutenant-general of the Air Force, two times Hero of the Soviet Union, cosmonaut
 Vladimir Shuralyov (1935–2020), Deputy Defence Minister of the Soviet Union
 Alexey Ivanovich Sorokin (1922–2020), Admiral of the Fleet
 Boris Tarasov (1932–2021), lieutenant-general
 Dmitry Yazov (1924–2020), last Marshal of the Soviet Union, Minister of Defence

See also
 Tomb of the Unknown Soldier (Moscow)
 Kremlin Wall Necropolis
 Novodevichy Cemetery
 List of national cemeteries by country

References

External links 

 Federal Military Memorial Cemetery on Wikimapia
 Mischa Gabowitsch: Russia's Arlington? The Federal Military Memorial Cemetery near Moscow

Cemeteries in Moscow Oblast
National cemeteries
Mytishchinsky District